Belvoir is a village and civil parish in the Melton district of Leicestershire, England, close to the county boundary with Lincolnshire. The nearest town is Grantham, 13 kilometres (8 mi) east of the village.

The village's name derives from bel-vedeir meaning 'the beautiful view'.

The parish includes the villages of Belvoir, Knipton and Harston. Nearby places outside the parish are Woolsthorpe by Belvoir, Redmile, and Croxton Kerrial.

The village is the site of Belvoir Castle, which "stands on a prominent spur jutting northwards" into the Vale of Belvoir.

Iron ore was formerly quarried in the parish and details can be found in the articles on Knipton and Harston. The quarries were near Harston, to the south of Knipton and between Belvoir and Knipton.

References

Villages in Leicestershire
Civil parishes in Leicestershire
Borough of Melton